Bukovica Gornja is a village in the City of Bijeljina, Republika Srpska, Bosnia and Herzegovina.

References

Populated places in Bijeljina